Britcar is an endurance sports car racing and touring car racing series in the United Kingdom.

It was formed in 1997, as a result of a discussion in a Nürburgring bar between Willie Moore and James Tucker. Folklore has it that James Tucker and John Veness formed the organizing European Endurance & Racing Club (EERC) with a £10 note found on the ground.  The foremost aim was the re-introduction of a 24-hour race in Britain.

At the end of the 2015 season, James sold the Britcar rights to Hedley Cowell Events Ltd. For the 2016 season, Claire Hedley re-launched Britcar Endurance as the Dunlop Endurance Championship and Dunlop Trophy Championship. For 2020 the series was invited to support the FIA World Endurance Championship races at Spa-Francorchamps and Silverstone. The race format was 2 × 60 mins Endurance races and 2 × 50 mins Trophy races.

Cars and results
There are two separate championships for different types of car; although some cars can run in both, they may be in different categories.

GTs, which include cars like Ferraris, Porsche Cup, Marcos, Moslers and Ginettas over a long-distance race, normally between two and four hours in length with a compulsory pit stop. Normally cars will have two or three drivers, but cars are sometimes driven by one driver, are given a longer time in the pits.

Production, which include cars like Renault Clio Cup, Seat León Supercopa, VW Golf, Porsche Boxster, BMW M3s, Lotus Elise and Mini Cooper S. These races are normally 90 minutes long, featuring a mandatory pit stop. There can be up to two drivers per car.

Drivers normally bring their own cars to Britcar events, where most cars are accepted if safe to race. Cars are assigned to different classes depending on the car, the car's equipment and other fittings the vehicle has.

Cars & classes
Cars that competed in the Britcar Endurance Championship from 2016 onwards:

Cars that competed in the British Endurance Championship from 2022 onwards:

Focus on diversity
As a series popular for its diversity in teams, cars and drivers that had regained the attention it lost before its reformation, Britcar were invited to support two WEC rounds, at Spa-Francorchamps and Silverstone (subsequently cancelled).  Britcar stated "we are immensely proud that our endeavours to produce a professionally-run nationally-based Championship have been recognised by organisers of one of the biggest Championships in global motorsport."

Reflecting diversity in both the Endurance and Trophy series, among the teams are Team BRIT whose drivers are all disabled, using specially developed hand controls.

Winners

Overall winner in each category, 2002 - 2022.

History

The successful first year of competition was in 2002, and following tremendous growth in 2003, it attracted Sky Sports coverage in their Motor Sports section in 2004.
The first year of the Britcar 24-Hour Race was 2005 which was won by Rollcentre Mosler of Martin Short. 
This was followed by packed grids in 2006 season culminating in a capacity field for the 24-Hours.
EERC became a Motor Sports Association (MSA) approved Championship in 2007 as well being the now essential 24 hours. It played a supporting role to the British round of the A1 Grand Prix.

In 2011 it became known as the MSA British Endurance championship.

Such was its popularity in some seasons that over-subscription meant there are reserves waiting for grid positions.

For the 2017 season, the format was changed. Drivers in all races would now accrue points towards the Dunlop Endurance Championship but drivers could choose to do two 50-minute races under the Sprint category, or one 50-minute and one 2-hour race in the Endurance category. Grids were combined and most events were to take place over a single day to save costs. The night race proved so popular in 2016 that a second night race was introduced, to run at Silverstone earlier in the same month.

For the 2019 season the format was changed again, merging Endurance and Sprint categories into a single grid for two 60-minute races per weekend, finishing the season with a single 60- and a single 120-minute night race at Brands Hatch. 

For 2020, Britcar introduced a Trophy category and a new series of shorter races to avoid the need to refuel ; named Britcar Trophy Category for cars under Class 4 performance and the TCR and GT4 cars, for classes 5–7. The majority of these new classes are production cars, such as the Smart Forfour, Mini JCW R56 and the Honda Civic Type R (FK2) which were popular in Class 5. Some Trophy Category events ran alongside Endurance events, whilst other events ran dedicated Trophy cards with no Endurance or Praga rounds at the weekend.

Also in 2020, the Endurance grid saw several new Praga sportscar prototype R1 and R1T entries balanced into the existing Endurance class system. In 2021 these entries were given a dedicated class.

In 2020 Britcar ran as a support event for the FIA World Endurance Championship for the first time, at the 2020 6 Hours of Spa-Francorchamps event, with two non-championship races consisting of Endurance and Trophy cars plus non-Britcar cars with one-off entries made under class 1 through class 7 specifications. WEC had additionally extended the invite to support the 2020 Silverstone event, but that entire event including the WEC round was later cancelled.

(This marked the introduction of the relationship with WEC specifically; Britcar has raced outside the UK, including at Spa-Francorchamps, in many earlier years.)

In 2021 the title sponsor changed from Dunlop to Goodyear (the parent company) in line with the BTCC.

For 2022, Motorsport UK granted permission for Britcar to run their Endurance Championship with the title "British" and to increase the race duration from 1-hour to 2- and 3- hour, with the aim of running even longer races in the future. A new website and new social media channels were launched to support this change. Praga split off from Endurance to have grids of their own, run under the Britcar/BARC umbrella while the Trophy Championship continued unchanged.

Silverstone Britcar 24-Hour
Britcar traditionally hosted an endurance race on the Silverstone GP circuit.

The presenters of the well-known British car show Top Gear, namely Jeremy Clarkson, Richard Hammond and James May - together with 'The Stig' - took part in the 2007 event, in a BMW 330d, coming third of the five diesel cars, and 39th overall, at the end of the 24 Hours.

At the end of the 2015 season, the rights for the Silverstone 24 hour endurance race were sold to Creventic to become the UK edition of their FIA "touring car" Endurance Series - although this round was then dropped in 2019.

For this event's history, see Silverstone Britcar 24-Hour

References

External links
 britcar-endurance.com official website from 2016 season onwards
 Britcar24hr.co.uk original URL - old site contents no longer available
 british-endurance-championship.com official website of the British Endurance Championship from 2022 season onwards

 
Auto racing series in the United Kingdom
Sports car racing series
Group GT3
2005 establishments in the United Kingdom